The 1999 RCA Championships was a men's tennis tournament played on outdoor hard courts. It was the 12th edition of the event known that year as the RCA Championships, and was part of the Championship Series of the 1999 ATP Tour. It took place at the Indianapolis Tennis Center in Indianapolis, Indiana, United States from August 16 through August 22, 1999. Eleventh-seeded Nicolás Lapentti won the singles title.

Finals

Singles

 Nicolás Lapentti defeated  Vince Spadea 4–6, 6–4, 6–4
 It was Lapentti's 1st singles title of the year and the 2nd of his career.

Doubles

 Paul Haarhuis /  Jared Palmer defeated  Olivier Delaître /  Leander Paes 6–3, 6–4

References

External links
 Official website
 ITF tournament edition details

RCA Championships
1999
RCA Championships
RCA Championships
RCA Championships